Andrew W. Brazee (December 27, 1826 – September 1, 1891) was a jurist from New York and Colorado. He served as an associate justice of the Colorado's territorial Supreme Court from 1875 to 1876.

Early life
Brazee was born in Niagara County, New York on December 27, 1826. During the Civil War, he volunteered for the 49th New York Volunteer Infantry, serving from August 1, 1861 to October 18, 1864 and rising to the rank of Major.

Career
He worked as an assistant United States attorney in the Northern District of New York before he relocated to Colorado and began a private law practice in Denver. On February 24, 1875 President Ulysses S. Grant appointed him associate justice of the territorial Colorado Supreme Court, a position he held until 1876 when the first state supreme court justices were elected and sworn in following Colorado's admission to the Union.

Brazee succeeded Judge James B. Belford on the territorial Supreme Court. After serving on the supreme court, he became a partner in a Denver law firm.

Brazee was appointed U.S. Attorney for Colorado on September 5, 1882. He served in this position until May 1886.

Death
Judge Brazee died on September 1, 1891 following a bout of difficulty breathing, and is buried in Denver's Fairmount Cemetery.

References

Justices of the Colorado Supreme Court
People from Niagara County, New York
People from Denver
United States Attorneys for the District of Colorado
1826 births
1891 deaths
Colorado lawyers
People of New York (state) in the American Civil War
19th-century American judges
19th-century American lawyers